Anzu Lawson is an American actress, singer, songwriter, comedian, playwright, director and screenwriter. She has also been credited under the names Cristina Lawson, Cristina Anzu Lawson and Anzu Cristina.

Early life
 
Anzu's American father was in the Navy, stationed in Japan, when he met and married her mother, Keiko. The family moved to Cerritos, California where they lived until Anzu was 15 years old, at which point the two girls moved to Japan with their mother after Anzu was scouted by a modeling agency and offered a 3-year modeling contract. After meeting Jon Anderson of the band YES in Japan. Anzu began recording music. She was signed to Avex Records – Japan where she reached Number #1 on the Japanese Billboard Charts in 2003 with her cover of "The Rose."

Music
Lawson was signed to Japanese a label  where she reached number 1 on the Japanese Billboard charts with her cover of the single "The Rose" on Avex Records.
She also reached number 1 on the European Dance charts with her single "Sweet Clarity" with a project called Aquabox produced by Lee Curreri.
She has also sung on multiple movie soundtracks produced by Harry Gregson-Williams, Heitor Pereira and Hans Zimmer such as The Chronicles of Narnia, Spy Game, The Da Vinci Code, Sinbad, and Illegal Tender. She also wrote the song "I Am Onto You" for No Way Back, starring Russell Crowe and directed by Frank Cappello.

Her first screen test was at age 8 to play Mako's granddaughter for an East West Players film production and she starred in her first American movie opposite Viggo Mortensen in American Yakuza, directed by Frank Cappello. Frank Cappello also directed the dark comedy He Was A Quiet Man, where he cast Anzu opposite Christian Slater, to play his neighbor. She was nominated "Best Actress" for her role as Yoko Ono in 2014 at the Hollywood Fringe Festival in the musical Rock and Roll's Greatest Lovers.

Comedy
As a stand-up comic, Anzu performs in comedy festivals as well as The Hollywood and Brea Improv, The Laugh Factory, The Ha-Ha Café, The Comedy Store and The IceHouse Pasadena.

Filmography
Lawson's TV and film credits are below:

TV

Film

Video games

References

External links
Official site
https://m.imdb.com/name/nm0493188

American television actresses
American film actresses
Place of birth missing (living people)
Living people
American actresses of Japanese descent
American film actors of Asian descent
Year of birth missing (living people)
21st-century American women